Kehsi Mansam (also known as Kehsi Mangam and as Kyithi Bansan) was a Shan state in what is today Burma. It belonged to the Eastern Division of the Southern Shan States. Its capital was Kehsi town, located by the Nam Heng River. The state included 378 villages and the population was mostly Shan, but there were also some Palaung people (Yins) in the area

History
Kehsi Mansam became independent from Hsenwi State in 1860. It was a tributary of Burma until 1887, when the Shan states submitted to British rule after the fall of the Konbaung dynasty.

Kehsi Mansam included the small substate of Kenglon (Kenglön), located in the southeastern part and almost totally encircled by Kehsi Mansam. In 1926 Kenglon State was incorporated into Kehsi Mansam.

Rulers 
The rulers of the state bore the title Myoza.
1860 - 1881                Hkun Yawt
1881 - 1914                Hkun Yawt Hseng                    (b. 1844 - d. 1914)
1914 - 19..                Hkun Long                          (b. 1881 - d. 19..)

References

External links
"Gazetteer of Upper Burma and the Shan states"

Shan States